Calentura may refer to:

Cuban fever, in older English sources often "calenture"
in Spanish, fever, or sexual arousal

Geography
Capiro Calentura National Park

Arts and entertainment
La calentura, 1847 poem by José Zorrilla
Orquesta La Calentura Álvaro del Castillo 
Calentura, album by ChocQuibTown runner up for Latin Grammy Award for Record of the Year 2011
Calentura (song), Yandel 2015
 "La Calentura", a song by cumbia band Roberto Ruiz y su Maquina Tropical featured on John Doe (The X-Files)

See also
Calenture (album)